WorkCover can refer to:
Workers' compensation
NT WorkSafe, is a Work Health and Safety (WHS) regulatory body divided into three distinct cells; WHS Inspectors, Permissioning and Advisory Service and finally, Workers' Compensation and Rehabilitation. NT WorkSafe is a sub department of the Department of Business (DoB), Northern Territory Government (NTG), Australia.  
ORS WorkCover, a unit of the Office of Regulatory Services, Department of Justice and Community Safety  of the Australian Capital Territory
WorkCover Authority of New South Wales, a workers' compensation agency in New South Wales, Australia
WorkCoverSA, a workers' compensation agency in South Australia
WorkCover Tasmania, a workers' compensation agency in Tasmania, Australia
WorkCover WA, a government agency responsible for the workers' compensation and injury management system in Western Australia
Victorian Workcover Authority, also known as WorkSafe Victoria, a workers' compensation agency in Victoria, Australia